Torben Bjørn Larsen (12 January 1944 – 21 May 2015) was a Danish economist and lepidopterist who studied butterflies particularly in Asia and Africa. He wrote books on the butterflies of west Africa, the Middle East and numerous papers, including descriptions of many new taxa. Based on his travels on work and studies of butterflies he also published a book on his adventures.

Life and work 
Larsen was born in Copenhagen, Denmark but his early days were spent in Greece where he became interested in butterflies. He grew up with his grandmother in Copenhagen briefly and then moved to live in India from 1951. His father worked for the UNICEF and he was sent in 1954 to a Danish mission school in Kotagiri in the Nilgiris in southern India. In 1958 he went to Denmark to continue studies and received a masters degree in economics from the University of Copenhagen in 1970. He married Kiki in 1971 (died 1989) and worked as a social demographer in the area of family planning with the International Planned Parenthood Federation in Beirut for a while during which time he published the Butterflies of Lebanon (1974).

Lepidoptera 
In 1958 Larsen tried to identify a Neptis species he had collected in the Nilgiris and was surprised when the insect curator (Sören Ludvig Paul Tuxen) at the Copenhagen museum could not help him identify it. It was then that he realized how little was known about the butterflies of the world and it was not until 1986 that he was able to identify that particular Neptis as Neptis nata.  In 1975 he moved to London where he pursued his doctoral thesis on the butterflies of the Middle East. Shortly after receiving his doctorate in 1984 he moved to work for DANIDA in India with his (second) wife Nancy Fee who worked for the World Health Organization. He studied butterflies in the various places where they lived and worked including the Philippines, Bangladesh, Ecuador, Papua New Guinea, Nigeria, Cameroon, Sierra Leone and Côte d’Ivoire. He collaborated on butterfly research with the Royal Africa Museum (MRAC), the African Butterfly Research Institute and other organizations. He was elected president of the Association for Tropical Lepidoptera in 1996. The genus Torbenia was named after him. He wrote several books on butterflies, and also a series of papers on anecdotes including those on the hazards of butterfly collecting.

Writings 
Apart from his articles to journals, Larsen wrote several books including:
 Larsen, T.B. 1990. The butterflies of Egypt. Apollo Books, Svendborg, Denmark.
 Larsen, T.B. (1991, 1996) The Butterflies of Kenya and their Natural History. Oxford University Press, Oxford
 Larsen, T.B. 2004. Butterflies of Bangladesh – an annotated checklist. IUCN, Bangladesh.
 Larsen, T.B. 2005. Butterflies of West Africa. 2 vols, Apollo Books, Svendborg, Denmark
He wrote a long-running series of anecdotes on his travels and butterfly collection trips in The Entomologist's Record and Journal of Variation which was later compiled into the book Hazards of Butterfly Collecting (2004).

  (Written in London 1978)
  (Written in London 1978)
  (Written in London 1980)
  (Written in New Delhi 1985)
  (Written in India 1984)
  (Written in India 1986)
  (Written on the Andaman islands 1988)
  (Written in London 1980)
  (Written in New Delhi 1986)
  (Written in India 1986)
  (Written in London 1988)
  (Written in Rwanda 1989)
  (Written in Botswana 1990)
 (Written in London 1988)
  (Written in London 1988).
  (Written in Ethiopia 1989)
  (Written on Madagascar 1989)
  (Written in Botswana 1991)
  (Written in Ethiopia 1990)
  (Written in Botswana 1991)
  (Written in Madrid 1989)
  (Written in Lagos, Nigeria 1989)
  (Written in London 1989)
  (Written in Botswana 1990)
 
  (Written in Belize 1990)
  (Written in Botswana 1990)
  (Written in London 1980)
  (Written in Gaborone 1991)
  (Written in London 1989)
  (Written in Nairobi Airport 1992)
  (Written in Copenhagen 1991)
  (Written in Gaborone 1990)
  (Written in Gaborone 1992)
  (Written in Gaborone 1991)
  (Written in London 1992)
  (Written at Newark and Sarasota viii.1993)
  (Written on KL 589, AMS-ACC 15.iv.94)
 (Written in Botswana 1991)
 (Written in Dhaka 1996 and on Hotel de France - KQ 441, HRE-NBO 1991)
  (Written in Cape Coast iii.93)
  (Written in Accra, April 1994).
  (Written in Jamaica and Miami ii.1993)
  (Written in London vi. 1995)
  (Written in Gaborone 1991)
  (Written in Accra 19.iv.1994)
  (Written in Gaborone 1991)
  (Written in London xii.1992)
  (Written in London April 1996)
  (Written in London 1992)
  (Written in Cape Coast Ghana 18.iii.1993)
  (Written in Gaborone 1992)
  (Written in London 11.xii.1996)
 
 
  (Written in Abidjan Airport 1996)
  (Written in Bangladesh May 1995)
  (Written in London ii.1996)
  (Written in Bangladesh May 1995)
  (Written in London 1997)
  (Written in Dhaka April 1995)
  (Written in Abidjan Airport 31.i.96)
  (Written 12.ii.1997 in the Western Hotel, Kumba, Cameroun while waiting for a vehicle gone missing).
  (Written in Manila April 1997)
  (Written in London 30 ix 1998)
  (Written in Bangladesh v.1999)
 
  (Written in Manila, June 1999)
  (Written in Bangladesh iii 1999)
  (Written in Manila June 2000)
  (Written in Manila January 2000)
  (Written in Manila June 1999)
  (Written in Malaysia 1999)
  (Written in Manila May 1999)
  (Written in Manila June 2000)
 
  (Written in Dhaka iii.2001)
  (Written in Manila Jan 2001)
  (Written in Bangladesh iii 2001)
  (Written in Dhaka, iii 2001)
  (Written in Dhaka 23 iii 2001)
  (Written in Dhaka 2002)
  (Written in Dhaka, Bangladesh June 2002)
  (Written in Dhaka May 2001)
  (Written in Dhaka 2001)
  (Written in Dhaka 2001)
  (Written in Bangkok Hospital viii.2002)
  (Written in Hanoi, August 2003)
  (Written in hospital in Bangkok, August 2002)
  (Written in Bangladesh September 2002)
  (Written in Dhaka, iii.2001)
  (Written in Bangladesh June 2002 )
  (written in Hanoi, August 2003)
 
  (written Hanoi 2003)
  (Written in Bangladesh September 2002)
  (Written in London, June 2003)
  (Written in Dhaka, March 2003)
  (written in London, June 2003)
 
 

(written in Hanoi, iii.2005)

  (Hanoi v.2004)
 
  (written Hanoi 26.iv.2005)
  (written in Copenhagen 9.iv.2006)
 
  (written in Hanoi, iv.2005)

References 

1944 births
2015 deaths
Danish lepidopterists